In probability theory and directional statistics, a wrapped normal distribution is a wrapped probability distribution that results from the "wrapping" of the normal distribution around the unit circle. It finds application in the theory of Brownian motion and is a solution to the heat equation for periodic boundary conditions. It is closely approximated by the von Mises distribution, which, due to its mathematical simplicity and tractability, is the most commonly used distribution in directional statistics.

Definition
The probability density function of the wrapped normal distribution is

where μ and σ are the mean and standard deviation of the unwrapped distribution, respectively. Expressing the above density function in terms of the characteristic function of the normal distribution yields:

where  is the Jacobi theta function, given by

 and 

The wrapped normal distribution may also be expressed in terms of the Jacobi triple product:

where  and

Moments 

In terms of the circular variable  the circular moments of the wrapped normal distribution are the characteristic function of the normal distribution evaluated at integer arguments:

where  is some interval of length . The first moment is then the average value of z, also known as the mean resultant, or mean resultant vector:

The mean angle is

and the length of the mean resultant is

The circular standard deviation, which is a useful measure of dispersion for the wrapped normal distribution and its close relative, the von Mises distribution is given by:

Estimation of parameters 

A series of N measurements zn = e iθn drawn from a wrapped normal distribution may be used to estimate certain parameters of the distribution. The average of the series  is defined as

and its expectation value will be just the first moment:

In other words,  is an unbiased estimator of the first moment. If we assume that the mean μ lies in the interval [−π, π), then Arg  will be a (biased) estimator of the mean μ.

Viewing the zn as a set of vectors in the complex plane, the 2 statistic is the square of the length of the averaged vector:

and its expected value is:

In other words, the statistic

will be an unbiased estimator of e−σ2, and ln(1/Re2) will be a (biased) estimator of σ2

Entropy 

The information entropy of the wrapped normal distribution is defined as:

where  is any interval of length .

where  is the Euler function. The logarithm of the density of the wrapped normal distribution may be written:

Using the series expansion for the logarithm:

the logarithmic sums may be written as:

so that the logarithm of density of the wrapped normal distribution may be written as:

Using the characteristic function representation for the wrapped normal distribution in the left side of the integral:

the entropy may be written:

which may be integrated to yield:

See also 

 Wrapped distribution
 Dirac comb
 Wrapped Cauchy distribution
 Von Mises distribution

References

External links
 Circular Values Math and Statistics with C++11, A C++11 infrastructure for circular values (angles, time-of-day, etc.) mathematics and statistics

Continuous distributions
Directional statistics
Normal distribution